Mirna may refer to:

Places
 Mirna (Adriatic Sea), a river in Croatia
 Mirna, Iran, a village in Iran

in Slovenia
 Mirna (Sava), a river in Slovenia
 Mirna Valley, a valley in Slovenia
 Mirna, Mirna, Slovenia; the seat of the eponymous municipality
 Municipality of Mirna, a municipality in Slovenia
 Mount Mirna, a hill in Slovenia

People
 Mirna (name), a female name

Other uses
 microRNA, abbreviated as miRNA
 , a United States Navy patrol boat in commission from 1917 to 1918
  (Type 171), a Yugoslav patrol boat class

See also